Khaled Malas is a Syrian architect and art historian. He is also a co-founder of the Sigil Collective alongside Salim al-Kadi, Alfred Tarazi and Jana Traboulsi.

Malas studied architecture at the American University of Beirut and at Cornell University. He is currently a doctoral candidate in medieval Islamic Art History at the Institute of Fine Arts at New York University. Prior to joining the Institute, he was an architect at the Office for Metropolitan Architecture and Herzog & de Meuron.

His work has been widely exhibited and published. Sigil's work has also been shown around the world including in Venice, Oslo, Annandale-on-Hudson, Beirut, Dubai and Marrakech. and Milan. He has taught at Columbia University's Graduate School of Architecture, Planning and Preservation (GSAPP), and at Columbia University's Columbia Global Center/Studio-X in Amman, where he led the second Janet Abu Lughod seminar which focused on Qusayr Amra.

Malas is a member of the Arab Image Foundation's General Assembly.

Works as Sigil 
 Excavating the Sky, The 14th International Architecture Exhibition: "Fundamentals: Absorbing Modernity 1914-2014". Directed by Rem Koolhaas, 2014 
 Current Power in Syria, The 6th Marrakech International Biennale: "Not New Now". Curated by Reem Fadda, 2016 
 Monuments of the Everyday, Oslo arkitekturtriennale: "After Belonging". Curated by After Belonging, 2016  
 Monuments of the Everyday, CCS Bard Galleries, Annandale-on-Hudson: "No to the Invasion: From the Archive". Curated by Fawz Kabra and Tarek al-Ariss, 2017 
 #therevolutionisamirror, Concrete (Alserkal Avenue), Dubai: "Syria: Into the Light". Curated by Mouna Atassi, 2017.
 Electric Resistance — Monument to a Destroyed Windmill, Sharjah Biennial 13: "Fruits of Sleep" Sursock Museum, Beirut. Curated by Christine Tohme and Reem Fadda, 2017
 Birdsong, XXII Esposizione Internazionale 12: "Broken Nature" La Triennale di Milano, Milan. Curated by Paola Antonelli, 2019 {{C. Davidson "Paola Antonelli on Broken Nature" Log (magazine) (Winter/Spring 2019) page 51}}

Selected awards and honors
2015: 'The Arab Fund for Arts and Culture Visual Arts Grant' 
2016: 'Distinguished Young Alumni Award of the Architecture & Design Department, Faculty of Engineering and Architecture, American University of Beirut, Awarded in recognition of interdisciplinary creativity and activism.

Selected writing 
2016: "Monuments of the Everyday" ‘After Belonging: The Objects, Spaces, and Territories of the Ways We Stay in Transit’ by Lluís Alexandre Casanovas Blanco, Ignacio G. Galán, Carlos Mínguez Carrasco, Alejandra Navarrete Llopis, and Marina Otero Verzier (eds.)(Zurich: Lars Muller, 2016)
2016: "Review: Pattern, Color, Light: Architectural Ornament in the Near East (500–1000)," Journal of the Society of Architectural Historians, Vol. 75 No. 2 (2016): pp. 238–239
2017: "The body, writhing in pain, sits before an intoxicated audience" ‘No to the Invasion: Breakdown and Side-effects’ edited by Fawz Kabra (Annandale-on-Hudson: CCS Bard, 2017)
2018: "A Cenotaph" Broken Nature Website http://www.brokennature.org/a-cenotaph/</ref>

Further reading 
 Watenpaugh Heghnar Zeitlian, “Cultural Heritage and the Arab Spring: War over Culture, Culture of War, and Culture War,” "International Journal of Islamic Architecture 5" (2016): pp. 245–63
 العربي الجديذ - خالد ملص: بحثاً عن عمارة الناس 
 Wilson-Goldie, Kaelen "Practical Magic: Can Art Make a Difference in Assad Syria?," Bookforum(Apr/May 2017): pp. 42–43
 فوّاز طرابلسي "حفريات السماء - حفريات الأرض" دم الأخوين: العنف في الحروب الأهليّة (بيروت: رياض الريّس للكتب و النشر, 2017), pp. 207–227
 Kafka, George "Active Witness" Icon (architecture magazine) Architecture and Design Culture (May 2019); pp. 52–60
 Davidson, Cynthia "Paola Antonelli on Broken Nature" Log (magazine) (Winter/Spring 2019); page 51

References 
 

People from Damascus
Syrian architects
21st-century Syrian historians
Syrian artists
1981 births
American University of Beirut alumni
Cornell University College of Architecture, Art, and Planning alumni
Living people